Marcelo Iván Allende Bravo (born April 7, 1999) is a Chilean footballer who plays as an attacking midfielder for Premier Soccer League side Mamelodi Sundowns and the Chile national team. Allende captained Chile at the 2015 FIFA U-17 World Cup and was the team's top goalscorer and is considered one of the top youth prospects in Chilean football.

Club career
Allende started his youth career at Cobreloa. After Chile's participation in the U-17 World Cup, he caught the interest of Colo-Colo and Universidad de Chile for his signature, although neither move materialized.

In 2016, the player transferred to Deportes Santa Cruz of the Segunda División de Chile in order to gain more playing time, making his debut against Naval. In his second season at the team, he scored his first senior goal against Melipilla, and became a regular starter, finishing the campaign with four goals.

Allende had a two-month trial with English club Arsenal, featuring for their under-19 team at the Durban International Cup. The team won the competition, and the player was invited to further trials with the club. In April 2017, following a third trial, the English tabloid press reported that Arsenal had offered Allende a professional contract.

Necaxa
With this being so on September 7, 2017 Allende signed up with Mexican side Necaxa, with the intention of rejoining the club in 2018 while remaining on loan with Santa Cruz.

Mamelodi Sundowns
On 24 August 2022, Allende was announced as new player of South African club Mamelodi Sundowns and made his debut in the same day scoring a goal versus Stellebosch.

International career
On June 15, 2015, Allende made his debut for Chile U-17 in a friendly defeat against Paraguay. He was later selected on the list of players that would take part in the tournament, held on home soil. He was a starter on Chile's four matches at the U-17 World Cup, netting against Nigeria and the United States.

On October 16, 2016, Allende made his debut for the Chile U-20 in a friendly win against Paraguay U-20 adding another cap against Ecuador U-20, but was ultimately left out of the final squad for the 2017 South American Youth Football Championship. He scored his first goal for the U20's on August 10, 2017, in a friendly win against Japan.

At under-20 level, Allende represented Chile in both the 2018 South American Games, winning the gold medal, and the 2019 South American Championship.

Allende made his debut for Chile national team on 11 December 2021 in a 1–0 win over El Salvador.

National team

Under 17

Participation in World Cups

Statistics 
 Updated to last played match: May 19, 2017.

Honours
Arsenal
Durban International Cup: Winner – 2016.

Necaxa
Copa MX: Clausura 2018
Supercopa MX: 2018

Chile U20
South American Games Gold medal: 2018

References

External links
 
 Marcelo Allende at playmakerstats.com (English version of ceroacero.es)
 

1999 births
Living people
Footballers from Santiago
Chilean footballers
Chilean expatriate footballers
Chile youth international footballers
Chile under-20 international footballers
Chile international footballers
Deportes Santa Cruz footballers
Club Necaxa footballers
Deportes Magallanes footballers
Magallanes footballers
Montevideo City Torque players
Mamelodi Sundowns F.C. players
Segunda División Profesional de Chile players
Liga MX players
Primera B de Chile players
Uruguayan Primera División players
South African Premier Division players
Chilean expatriate sportspeople in England
Chilean expatriate sportspeople in Mexico
Chilean expatriate sportspeople in Uruguay
Chilean expatriate sportspeople in South Africa
Expatriate footballers in England
Expatriate footballers in Mexico
Expatriate footballers in Uruguay
Expatriate soccer players in South Africa
Association football midfielders
South American Games gold medalists for Chile
South American Games medalists in football
Competitors at the 2018 South American Games